Luis Muñoz may refer to:
 Luis Muñoz de Guzmán (1735–1808), Spanish colonial administrator
 Luis Muñoz Rivera (1859–1916), Puerto Rican poet, journalist and politician
Luis Muñoz Rivera Park, Puerto Rican park named after the politician
Luis Muñoz Rivera (Ponce statue), Puerto Rican statue of the politician
Casa Natal de Luis Muñoz Rivera cultural and historical building where the politician was born
 Luis Muñoz Marín (1898–1980), Puerto Rican journalist, activist and politician
 Luis Muñoz Marín International Airport, Puerto Rican airport named after the politician
 Ruta Panorámica Luis Muñoz Marín, network of roads named after the politician
 Retrato de Luis Muñoz Marín (1977) oil painting of the politician
 Luis Muñoz Rivera (senator) (1916–2006), Puerto Rican senator
 Luis Muñoz (bobsledder) (1928–1989), Spanish Olympic bobsledder
 Luis Muñoz (boxer) (born 1947), Chilean Olympic boxer
 Luis Muñoz (poet) (born 1966), Spanish poet
 Luis Enrique Muñoz (born 1988), Mexican-born footballer
 Luis Muñoz (footballer) (José Luis Muñoz León, born 1997), Spanish footballer